Ali Fikrat Oglu Alizada (born 21 June 1978) is an Azerbaijani diplomat who is the current Azerbaijan Ambassador to Iran since 7 August 2021.
Prior to that, he served as Consul General of the Azerbaijan in Tabriz (2010–2016).

Career 
 Azerbaijan Ambassador to Pakistan - since July 2016

References 

Azerbaijani diplomats
1978 births
Living people
Azerbaijan University of Languages alumni
Academy of Public Administration (Azerbaijan) alumni
Ambassadors of Azerbaijan to Pakistan